In harmonic analysis in mathematics, a function of bounded mean oscillation, also known as a BMO function, is a real-valued function whose mean oscillation is bounded (finite). The space of functions of bounded mean oscillation (BMO), is a function space that, in some precise sense, plays the same role in the theory of Hardy spaces Hp that the space L∞ of essentially bounded functions plays in the theory of Lp-spaces: it is also called John–Nirenberg space, after Fritz John and Louis Nirenberg who introduced and studied it for the first time.

Historical note 
The next important step in the development of the theory was the proof by Charles Fefferman of the duality between BMO and the Hardy space H1, in the noted paper : a constructive proof of this result, introducing new methods and starting a further development of the theory, was given by Akihito Uchiyama.

Definition 
 The mean oscillation of a locally integrable function u over a hypercube Q in Rn is defined as the value of the following integral:

where
|Q| is the volume of Q, i.e. its Lebesgue measure
uQ is the average value of u on the cube Q, i.e. 

 A BMO function is a locally integrable function u whose mean oscillation supremum, taken over the set of all cubes Q contained in Rn, is finite.

Note 1. The supremum of the mean oscillation is called the BMO norm of u. and is denoted by ||u||BMO (and in some instances it is also denoted ||u||∗).

Note 2.

Notation

The universally adopted notation used for the set of BMO functions on a given domain  is BMO(): when  = Rn, BMO(Rn) is simply symbolized as BMO.
The BMO norm of  a given BMO function u is denoted by ||u||BMO: in some instances, it is also denoted as ||u||∗.

Basic properties

BMO functions are locally p–integrable
BMO functions are locally Lp if 0 < p < ∞, but need not be locally bounded. In fact, using the John-Nirenberg Inequality, we can prove that

BMO is a Banach space 
Constant functions have zero mean oscillation, therefore functions differing for a constant c > 0 can share the same BMO norm value even if their difference is not zero almost everywhere. Therefore, the function ||u||BMO is properly a norm on the quotient space of BMO functions modulo the space of constant functions on the domain considered.

Averages of adjacent cubes are comparable
As the name suggests, the mean or average of a function in BMO does not oscillate very much when computing it over cubes close to each other in position and scale. Precisely, if Q and R are dyadic cubes such that their boundaries touch and the side length of Q is no less than one-half the side length of R (and vice versa), then

where C > 0 is some universal constant. This property is, in fact, equivalent to f being in BMO, that is, if f is a locally integrable function such that |fR−fQ| ≤ C for all dyadic cubes Q and R adjacent in the sense described above and f is in dyadic BMO (where the supremum is only taken over dyadic cubes Q), then f is in BMO.

BMO is the dual vector space of H1 
 showed that the BMO space is dual to H1, the Hardy space with p = 1.  The pairing between f ∈ H1 and g ∈ BMO is given by

though some care is needed in defining this integral, as it does not in general converge absolutely.

The John–Nirenberg Inequality
The John–Nirenberg Inequality is an estimate that governs how far a function of bounded mean oscillation may deviate from its average by a certain amount.

Statement

Conversely, if this inequality holds over all cubes with some constant C in place of ||f||BMO, then f is in BMO with norm at most a constant times C.

A consequence: the distance in BMO to L∞
The John–Nirenberg inequality can actually give more information than just the BMO norm of a function. For a locally integrable function f, let A(f) be the infimal A>0 for which

The John–Nirenberg inequality implies that A(f) ≤ C||f||BMO for some universal constant C. For an L∞ function, however, the above inequality will hold for all A > 0. In other words, A(f) = 0 if f is in L∞. Hence the constant A(f) gives us a way of measuring how far a function in BMO is from the subspace L∞. This statement can be made more precise: there is a constant C, depending only on the dimension n, such that for any function f ∈ BMO(Rn) the following two-sided inequality holds

Generalizations and extensions

The spaces BMOH and BMOA 

When the dimension of the ambient space is 1, the space BMO can be seen as a linear subspace of harmonic functions on the unit disk and plays a major role in the theory of Hardy spaces: by using , it is possible to define the BMO(T) space on the unit circle as the space of functions f : T → R such that

i.e. such that its  over every arc I of the unit circle is bounded. Here as before fI is the mean value of f over the arc I.

 An Analytic function on the unit disk is said to belong to the Harmonic BMO or in the BMOH space if and only if it is the Poisson integral of a BMO(T) function. Therefore, BMOH is the space of all functions u with the form:

equipped with the norm:

The subspace of analytic functions belonging BMOH is called the Analytic BMO space or the BMOA space.

BMOA as the dual space of H1(D) 
Charles Fefferman in his original work proved that the real BMO space is dual to the real valued harmonic Hardy space on the upper half-space Rn × (0, ∞]. In the theory of Complex and Harmonic analysis on the unit disk, his result is stated as follows. Let Hp(D) be the Analytic Hardy space  on the unit Disc. For p = 1 we identify (H1)* with BMOA  by pairing f ∈ H1(D) and g ∈ BMOA using the anti-linear transformation Tg

Notice that although the limit always exists for an H1 function f and Tg is an element of the dual space  (H1)*, since the transformation is anti-linear, we don't have an isometric isomorphism between (H1)* and BMOA. However one can obtain an isometry if they consider a kind of space of conjugate BMOA functions.

The space VMO 
The space VMO of functions of vanishing mean oscillation is the closure in BMO of the continuous functions that vanish at infinity. It can also be defined as the space of functions whose "mean oscillations" on cubes Q are not only bounded, but also tend to zero uniformly as the radius of the cube Q tends to 0 or ∞.  The space VMO is a sort of Hardy space analogue of the space of continuous functions vanishing at infinity, and in particular the real valued harmonic Hardy space H1 is the dual of VMO.

Relation to the Hilbert transform
A locally integrable function f on R is BMO if and only if it can be written as

where fi ∈ L∞, α is a constant and H is the Hilbert transform.

Similarly f is VMO if and only if it can be represented in the above form with fi bounded uniformly continuous functions on R.

The dyadic BMO space 
Let Δ denote the set of dyadic cubes in Rn. The space dyadic BMO, written BMOd is the space of functions satisfying the same inequality as for BMO functions, only that the supremum is over all dyadic cubes. This supremum is sometimes denoted ||•||BMOd.

This space properly contains BMO.  In particular, the function log(x)χ[0,∞) is a function that is in dyadic BMO but not in BMO. However, if a function f is such that ||f(•−x)||BMOd ≤ C for all x in Rn for some C > 0, then by the one-third trick f is also in BMO. In the case of BMO on Tn instead of Rn, a function f is such that ||f(•−x)||BMOd ≤ C for n+1 suitably chosen x, then f is also in BMO. This means BMO(Tn ) is the intersection of n+1 translation of dyadic BMO. By duality,  H1(Tn ) is the sum of n+1 translation of dyadic  H1.

Although dyadic BMO is a much narrower class than BMO, many theorems that are true for BMO are much simpler to prove for dyadic BMO, and in some cases one can recover the original BMO theorems by proving them first in the special dyadic case.

Examples
Examples of BMO functions include the following:
 All bounded (measurable) functions. If f is in L∞, then ||f||BMO ≤ 2||f||∞: however, the converse is not true as the following example shows.
 The function log(|P|) for any polynomial P that is not identically zero: in particular, this is true also for |P(x)| = |x|.
 If w is an A∞ weight, then log(w) is BMO. Conversely, if f is BMO, then eδf is an A∞ weight for δ>0 small enough: this fact is a consequence of the John–Nirenberg Inequality.

Notes

References

Historical references
. A historical paper about the fruitful interaction of elasticity theory and mathematical analysis.
.

Scientific references

.
.
.
.
.
.
.
.
.

.
.
.

Function spaces
Functional analysis
Harmonic analysis